TWA Flight 355 was a domestic Trans World Airlines flight that was hijacked on September 10, 1976 by five "Fighters for Free Croatia", a group seeking Croatian independence from Yugoslavia.

In a coincidence, the incident occurred on the same day as the Zagreb mid-air collision.

Hijacking
The Boeing 727 plane took off from New York's LaGuardia Airport and was headed to O'Hare International Airport in Chicago. The hijackers were Slobodan Vlašić, Zvonko Bušić, his wife Julienne Bušić, Petar Matanić, and Frane Pešut. The hijackers claimed to have a bomb with them as they seized control of the plane in the 95th minute of its flight.

The group redirected the plane to Montreal's Mirabel International Airport where they refueled and told officials that they had planted a bomb in a locker at Grand Central Terminal and gave them instructions on finding it. They demanded that an appeal to the American people concerning Croatia's independence be printed in The New York Times, The Washington Post, the Chicago Tribune, the Los Angeles Times, and the International Herald Tribune. The plane was then flown to Gander, Newfoundland, where 35 of its passengers were released. From there the plane was accompanied by a larger TWA plane that guided it to Keflavík, Iceland. The hijackers' initial European destination was London, but the British government refused them permission to land.

During the hijacking the device at Grand Central Terminal was found and taken to Rodman's Neck Firing Range where police attempted to dismantle it rather than detonate it. After setting a cutting instrument on the two wires attached to the device, the officers retreated from the pit for several minutes. When they returned to the pit to continue dismantling the device, it exploded and killed NYPD officer Brian Murray, and wounded another, Terrence McTigue.

The plane landed in Paris where the hijackers surrendered after direct talks with U.S. ambassador Kenneth Rush, and their supposedly explosive devices were revealed to be fakes, simple pressure cookers. As the police took Julienne Bušić away, the plane's pilot gave her a hug in gratitude for her calming of the passengers during the hijacking.

Imprisonment
Frane Pešut served 12 years in prison. He was deported to Croatia in 2007. Petar Matanić and Slobodan Vlašić were released along with Pešut in 1988. Julienne Bušić was released in 1989.

By the 1990s and early 2000s, the last remaining hijacker in prison was Zvonko Bušić. On several occasions after Croatian independence, Croatian president Franjo Tuđman appealed to American president Bill Clinton for Bušić's release or transfer to Croatia. In 2003, the Croatian Parliament passed a resolution that Bušić should be transferred to Croatia, which it submitted to the Council of Europe. The liberal Croatian Helsinki Committee also took up the cause of Bušić's release.

On June 7, 2008 Bušić was granted parole after 32 years of imprisonment. Bušić was paroled and deported to Croatia where he was greeted by approximately 500 people at Zagreb's Pleso airport. Among those in the crowd were Dražen Budiša, Anto Kovačević, and Marko Perković, as well as all four of the other hijackers. The crowd gave a Nazi salute.

Julienne Bušić wrote a book named Lovers and Madmen about the hijacking and her love for the head of the operation.

Zvonko Bušic committed suicide on September 1, 2013 by gunshot at his home in Rovanjska near Zadar; he was discovered by his wife. He was 67 years old.

Agenda-setting  
Agenda-setting is a concept created and developed by Dr. Max McCombs and Dr. Donald Shaw. It is a function of mass media, highlighting issues seen as more important at the expense of other news. In this manner, the media forces attention towards a certain issue. For terrorist groups, this agenda setting function is a key tool for communicating a message across a nation or around the world. Terrorist groups may manipulate or compel influential media organisations, such as The New York Times and The Washington Post, to assist them in this. Prior to the TWA Flight 355 hijacking, the Croatian criminals demanded that flyers be dropped throughout large cities in order to force attention to their motivations and arranged with certain newspapers to use their statements to report on the issue.

See also
Trans World Airlines Flight 106

References

External links
Your Blood and Mine Official Website
Green Light Interview with Julienne Bušić, October 2004
Zvonko and Julienne Bušić's official website

Aircraft hijackings in the United States
Accidents and incidents involving the Boeing 727
355
Aviation accidents and incidents in the United States in 1976
Croatian nationalist terrorism
Aircraft hijackings
September 1976 events in North America
Terrorist incidents in the United States in 1976
Terrorist incidents in Canada in the 1970s
Terrorist incidents in North America in 1976
1976 crimes in Canada
1976 murders in the United States